Monaco competed in the Summer Olympic Games for the first time at the 1920 Summer Olympics held in Antwerp, Belgium.

Competitors
In the long jump, Edmond Médecin of Monaco achieved 21st place in the eliminatory round with a jump of 6.035 m (19′ 9″).
Joseph Grovetto and Michel Porasso represented Monaco in the individual gymnastics competition.

Athletics

Two athletes represented Monaco in the nation's debut in 1920.

Ranks given are within the heat.

Gymnastics

Two gymnasts represented Monaco in 1920. It was the nation's debut in the sport. Monaco's gymnasts took twelfth and twenty-second among the 25-man field.

Artistic gymnastics

References

 
 J.O. d'Anvers 
 

Nations at the 1920 Summer Olympics
1920
Olympics